Juliana "Juli" Furtado (born April 4, 1967 in New York City) is a retired American professional mountain biker, who began her sports career in skiing.

After knee injuries dashed her hopes of ski success, she took up cycling and won the US National Road Championship, and then went on to be very successful at mountain bike events - during her short 6-year career in MTB Furtado won five national titles and represented her country at the Olympics.

Early life
Born on April 4, 1967, her father's parents were Portuguese from São Miguel Island. She started skiing at age two, and racing at age 9 after her family moved to Vermont, where Furtado attended the Stratton Mountain School.

At age 15 she became the youngest member of the U.S. National ski team, for which she competed from 1982 to 1987. After undergoing several knee operations, Furtado's hopes of competing in the Olympics were forced to an end, and she attended University of Colorado Boulder on a skiing scholarship, where she received her BA in Marketing.  While racing for CU her knee injuries forced her to retire from competitive skiing, and Juliana switched to cycling.

Cycling
In 1989, her first year competing, Furtado won the US National Road Championship. She was then introduced to mountain biking, and 1990, again her first year competing, she won the cross-country event in (along with Ned Overend) the first official Mountain Bike World Championship, held in Durango, Colorado. In 1992 she won the downhill world championship. In 1996, Furtado won both the World Cup (her 3rd WC championship) and the NORBA (U.S. National race authority) cross-country championships. She also participated in the Atlanta Olympics. Unfortunately, though she was the overwhelming favorite to win, she suffered in the severe Atlanta sun and heat due to the as yet undetected Lupus in her system, and finished with an uncharacteristically slow 7th place. Soon after her Lupus was diagnosed, and again Furtado was forced into early retirement from her sport due to physical conditions. Her disease is currently under control and she still rides solo.

Women's bikes
After retiring, Furtado started a company to design and produce female specific MTB components, such as smaller diameter handlebars and grips, stems, and seats.

Her designs were eventually picked up by Santa Cruz Bikes. At the same time, Santa Cruz Bikes developed the first female specific cross-country aluminum MTB called the "Juliana". Furtado became the director of grass-roots sponsorship and marketing for Santa Cruz Bicycles, in Santa Cruz, California. In 2013, Furtado developed the concept for turning the single Juliana frame and associated components into a complete line of fully outfitted women's mountain bikes, which would be a first for Santa Cruz Bikes, which is primarily a frame producer. The Juliana line has 5 models comprising one of the world's largest women's MTB ranges in the industry.

Legacy
In 1998, the book "Rugged Racer" was written about Juliana's struggles and successes, overcoming injuries in her pursuit of her dream to compete in the Olympics. Despite a short MTB career of 6 years, Juliana held a Guinness World Record for most career 1st-place finishes in MTB (male or female), and at that time her career total wins even exceeded the combined total wins of the most successful man (Ned Overend) and next most successful woman.

She became the mother of a son in 2008, and is currently working again with the U.S. National ski team, as an advocate for retiring athletes.

Furtado was inducted into the Mountain Bike Hall of Fame in 1993 and the United States Bicycling Hall of Fame in 2005.

References

External links

1967 births
Living people
American female cyclists
Cross-country mountain bikers
Downhill mountain bikers
American people of Portuguese descent
Cyclists at the 1996 Summer Olympics
Olympic cyclists of the United States
Sportspeople from New York City
Cyclists from Vermont
UCI Mountain Bike World Champions (women)
Pan American Games medalists in cycling
Pan American Games silver medalists for the United States
American mountain bikers
Cyclists at the 1995 Pan American Games
Medalists at the 1995 Pan American Games
People with lupus
21st-century American women
Cyclists from New York (state)
20th-century American women